Valenta (feminine Valentová) is a Czech and Slovak surname. Notable people with the surname include: 

 Aleš Valenta (b. 1973), Czech skier
 Arnošt Valenta (1912–1944), Czech aviator, one of "The Fifty" men murdered by the Gestapo after the Great Escape, World War II
 Edvard Valenta (1901–1978), Czech journalist and author
 Ivo Valenta, Czech businessman and politician
 Jaroslava Valentová, Czech athlete
 Jiří Valenta (footballer), Czech footballer
 Matěj Valenta, Czech footballer
 Michal Valenta, Czech footballer 
 Ondřej Valenta, Czech cross-country skier
 Róbert Valenta, Slovak footballer
 Soňa Valentová, Slovak actress
 Velimir Valenta (1929–2004), Croatian rower
 Věroslav Valenta, Czech athlete
 Vít Valenta (b. 1983), Czech football player
 Zdeněk Valenta, Czech canoer

Other uses 
 Paxman Valenta, diesel engine

Czech-language surnames